Spotlight is the largest casting resource in the United Kingdom. Founded in 1927, it has over 70,000 actors, actresses, presenters, dancers, and stunt performers in its database. It is used by thousands of production companies, broadcasters, advertisement agencies, and casting directors. Clients range from large organisations such as the BBC, ITV, and Channel 4 to smaller production companies. It publishes its "Contacts" handbook both in hard copy and as an e-book. It includes listings for over 5,000 companies, services, and individuals across all branches of film, television, stage, video games, and voice acting. Spotlight is one of the most successful companies in casting, generating over £10 million per year. Although established since 1927, it only registered as a limited company in 2010. It does not disclose its profits publicly.

References

External links
 Spotlight website

Directories
1927 establishments in the United Kingdom
Casting companies